Jonas Roup McClintock (January 8, 1808 – November 25, 1879) was an American physician and Democratic politician from Pennsylvania who served as the 8th Mayor of Pittsburgh from 1836 to 1839.  He also served as a member of the Pennsylvania House of Representatives from 1850 to 1854 and the Pennsylvania State Senate for the 22nd district from 1854 to 1856.

Early life and education
Jonas Roup McClintock was born in Pittsburgh, Pennsylvania in 1808 to John and Elizabeth (Roup) McClintock.  He graduated from Western University of Pennsylvania, the forerunner to the University of Pittsburgh, and received a M.D. degree from the University of Maryland Medical School in 1830.  He rose to local prominence due to his efforts in treating Pittsburgh residents during the cholera epidemics in the early 1830s.  In 1832 he organized Pittsburgh's first board of health. He was a member of the local vigilance committee and Captain of the Vigilant Fire Company.

Career
He became mayor of Pittsburgh at age 28.  He was the youngest mayor in Pittsburgh (until Luke Ravenstahl) and was known affectionately as the "Boy Mayor".  His administration established the Pittsburgh Police Department.  He also implemented major infrastructure improvements in the city including the original "cut" of Grant's Hill, a steep bluff boxing the city in on the east.  The "cut" allowed for settlement of an area of the city previously uninhabitable because of the grade of the land.  The city also expanded during his time as mayor with the annexation of the Northern Liberties Borough.

He worked as a melter and refiner at the Philadelphia Mint from 1840 to 1847.

McClintock served as a member of the Pennsylvania House of Representatives from 1850 to 1854 and the Pennsylvania State Senate for the 22nd district from 1854 to 1856.  As a state senator, he sponsored legislation which established free secondary education in Pennsylvania.

After leaving public service, he worked in the iron business and farming.

During the U.S. Civil War, McClintock help organize a troop company of over 3,500 men.  He was the first captain of the 12th Pennsylvania Infantry Regiment also known as the Duquesne Grays.  He died in 1879 and was interred in Allegheny Cemetery.

See also

List of Mayors of Pittsburgh

References

|-

|-

1808 births
1879 deaths
19th-century American physicians
19th-century American politicians
American firefighters
Burials at Allegheny Cemetery
Mayors of Pittsburgh
Democratic Party members of the Pennsylvania House of Representatives
Democratic Party Pennsylvania state senators
People of Pennsylvania in the American Civil War
Physicians from Pennsylvania
University of Maryland School of Medicine alumni
University of Pittsburgh alumni